Moelfre Lifeboat Station is located in the village of Moelfre, Anglesey and is run by the Royal National Lifeboat Institution. The present boathouse became operational in March 2015.

The original boathouse was built in 1875 closer to the centre of the village and was replaced in 1909 by one occupying the present location. This was modified several times between 1930 and 1993 to accommodate larger boats; its slipway had been commensurately lengthened as well. This station was stone-built with rendered walls and a slate roof, on a rectangular base of coursed, squared limestone.

There are 2 lifeboats present at the station. The All Weather boat, Tamar class, reference (16-25) is called "Kiwi" in appreciation of the major sponsor of the boat's construction who happened to hail from New Zealand. The inshore boat is a D class RIB called Enfys. The all weather normally has a crew of 6 or 7 and the inshore 3.

Memorial Statue 
On 23 November 2004, a bronze statue in memory of Richard (Dic) Evans, situated adjacent to the Moelfre lifeboat station was unveiled by Prince Charles, the Prince of Wales. The statue stands 7ft high on a granite plinth and was created by the Sam Holland. Richard Evans (1905 - 2001) served as a crewmen at the station for 50 years and was credited with saving 281 lives.

References

External links
 Moelfre Lifeboat Station

Lifeboat stations in Wales
Buildings and structures in Anglesey